Klondike: The Quest for Gold is a Canadian documentary television series, which aired in 2003 on The History Network. It follows the journey of five modern-day people as they recreate the journey made over 100,000 people during the Klondike Gold Rush. They are supplied with 1897 period-appropriate clothing and gear, and make the journey from Dyea, Alaska to Dawson City, Yukon. They are provided with three months of food, mining equipment, and a knockdown boat, all totaling 3000 pounds, carried on their shoulders or in period-appropriate backpacks.

It is part of the "Quest" series from producer Jamie Brown, which also included Pioneer Quest: A Year in the Real West (2001), Quest for the Bay (2002), and Quest for the Sea (2004).

Cast

 Sebastien Racine: 19 years old, youngest of the group
 Dave Delnea: 22 years old, expedition photographer
 Andria Bellon: Granddaughter of Klondike can-can girl
 Rick Unrau: Jack of all trades
 Joe Bishop: 41 years old, songwriter and oldest of the group

Tlingit Aboriginal Pack Men "Packers" were hired to assist carrying the gear.

 Ron Chambers: Bush guide
 Ralph James: Descendant of a Packer
 Ron Altin: Descendant of a Packer

Episodes

References

External links 
 

2000s Canadian documentary television series
Historical reality television series
History (Canadian TV network) original programming
2003 Canadian television series debuts
2003 Canadian television series endings